Nancy Margaret Reid  (born September 17, 1952) is a Canadian theoretical statistician. She is a professor at the University of Toronto where she holds a Canada Research Chair in Statistical Theory.  In 2015 Reid became Director of the Canadian Institute for Statistical Sciences. 

Reid has served as President of the Institute of Mathematical Statistics and the Statistical Society of Canada.  
She is co-editor of the Annual Review of Statistics and Its Application.

In 1992, Reid received the  COPSS Presidents' Award for outstanding contributions to statistics. She is a Fellow of  the Royal Society, the Royal Society of Edinburgh, and the Royal Society of Canada; a Foreign Associate of the National Academy of Sciences; and an Officer of the Order of Canada.

Education  
Nancy Reid was born in St. Catharines, Ontario, Canada.   
She studied mathematics and statistics at the University of Waterloo, earning her B.Math in 1974.  She earned her M.Sc. at the University of British Columbia in 1976.  At Stanford University  she worked with  Rupert G. Miller, Jr., receiving her Ph.D. in 1974. Reid did postdoctoral work with David Cox  at the Imperial College London from 1979–1980.

Career and research
From 1980-1985 Reid was an associate professor at the University of British Columbia. She then joined the University of Toronto and has remained there ever since, becoming a full professor in 1988. 

Reid was the first woman to hold a Canada Research Chair in statistics.
As Chair of the “Long Range Plan Steering Committee for Mathematics and Statistics” Reid shaped Canadian national policy on mathematical sciences, leading to the creation of the virtual distributed Canadian Institute for Statistical Sciences  (CANSSI) in 2012.  She has been the Director of CANSSI since 2015. 

Reid studies the foundations and properties of methods of statistical inference in order to discover how inferential statements can accurately and effectively summarize complex data sets.

Reid served as Editor-in-Chief of The Canadian Journal of Statistics from 1995–1997 and the Annual Review of Statistics and Its Application (2018-). 
She served as President of the Institute of Mathematical Statistics (1996-1997),
and of the Statistical Society of Canada (2004–2005).

Awards and honours
Reid won the COPSS Presidents' Award in 1992,
the Krieger–Nelson Prize in 1995, 
the Statistical Society of Canada Gold Medal 
and Florence Nightingale David Award in 2009, 
and the Statistical Society of Canada Distinguished Service Award in 2013.
She was made an Officer of the Order of Canada (awarded 2014, invested 2015) "for her leadership in the field of statistical inference, which has helped to facilitate sound public policy decision making." 

In 2022, Reid won the Guy medal in Gold "for her pioneering work on higher-order approximate inference which provides a foundational basis for optimal information extraction from data, and has wide-ranging impact on the practice of data analysis".

In 1989 she was elected as a Fellow of the American Statistical Association. 
She was elected a Fellow of the Royal Society of Canada in 2001. 
She is also a Fellow of the Institute of Mathematical Statistics. 
In 2015 she was elected a Corresponding Fellow of the Royal Society of Edinburgh, 
and in 2016 a foreign associate of the United States National Academy of Sciences. 
She was elected a Fellow of the Royal Society (FRS) in 2018.

Some publications

References 

1952 births
Living people
Canadian statisticians
Officers of the Order of Canada
Presidents of the Institute of Mathematical Statistics
Women mathematicians
Women statisticians
Academic staff of the University of Toronto
Academic staff of the University of British Columbia
Canadian women academics
Fellows of the American Statistical Association
Fellows of the Institute of Mathematical Statistics
Fellows of the Royal Society of Canada
Foreign associates of the National Academy of Sciences
Presidents of the Statistical Society of Canada
Canadian Fellows of the Royal Society
Female Fellows of the Royal Society
Annual Reviews (publisher) editors
University of Waterloo alumni
Mathematical statisticians